The Isuzu Erga Journey-K (kana:いすゞ・ジャーニーK) was a midibus built by Isuzu of Japan from 1984 to 1999. The range was primarily available as a public bus and an intercity bus either as an integral bus or a bus chassis.

It can be either offered as Two Step (known as step entrance) or One Step (known as low entry) in lengths 9m only. It was superseded by the Isuzu Erga Mio in 2000.

Isuzu medium-duty buses 
BK30 (1972)
CCM370/410 (1976)
K-CCM370/410 (1980)
K-CDM370/410 (1982)

Models 
P-LR212/311/312 (1984)
U-LR312/332 (1990)
KC-LR233/333 (1995)

Model lineup 
One Step 9m
Two Step 9m

See also 

 List of buses

References

External links

Buses of Japan
Midibuses
Low-entry buses
Bus chassis
Isuzu buses
Vehicles introduced in 1984